Claudia Lapacó (June 25, 1940) is an Argentine actress.

Awards

Nominations
 2013 Martín Fierro Awards
 Best actress of miniseries

References

Argentine actresses
Living people
1940 births
Place of birth missing (living people)